Ronald A. Irwin  (October 29, 1936 – December 5, 2020) was a Canadian diplomat and politician.

Life
Born in Sault Ste. Marie, Ontario, Irwin earned an undergraduate degree from the University of Western Ontario and a law degree from Osgoode Hall Law School of York University. While at the University of Western Ontario he joined the Sigma Kappa Sigma chapter of Delta Upsilon.  From 1972 to 1974, he was mayor of Sault Ste. Marie. He also served as a school trustee, alderman and director of the local Chamber of Commerce. From 1977 to 1980, he was a member of the Canadian Radio-television and Telecommunications Commission.

Irwin was first elected to the House of Commons of Canada in the 1980 federal election as a Liberal. He served as parliamentary secretary to Jean Chrétien while the latter was Justice Minister. Irwin was defeated in the 1984 election but returned to Parliament in the 1993 election.

When the Liberals returned to power as a result of the 1993 election, Chrétien, now Prime Minister of Canada, appointed Irwin to the Cabinet as Minister of Indian Affairs and Northern Development. He retired from parliament in 1997.

Irwin served as a personal advisor to Prime Minister Chrétien from 1997 to 1998. He was appointed  Canadian Ambassador to Ireland in 1998, and served until 2001. In 2001, Irwin was appointed Canada’s Consul General to Boston.

In 1975, he was made a Member of the Order of Canada. He died on December 5, 2020 at the age of 84.

References

External links
 

Canadian King's Counsel
Canadian Ministers of Indian Affairs and Northern Development
Canadian people of Irish descent
Liberal Party of Canada MPs
Mayors of Sault Ste. Marie, Ontario
Members of the 26th Canadian Ministry
Members of the House of Commons of Canada from Ontario
Members of the Order of Canada
Members of the King's Privy Council for Canada
Lawyers in Ontario
University of Western Ontario alumni
1936 births
2020 deaths
Osgoode Hall Law School alumni
Ambassadors of Canada to Ireland